Odostomia tasmanica, common name the Tasmania pyramid-shell,  is a species of sea snail, a marine gastropod mollusc in the family Pyramidellidae, the pyrams and their allies.

Description
The length of the shell measures 2 mm.

Distribution

References

 OBIS : Odostomia tasmanica
 CF Laseron, The Family Pyramidellidae (Mollusca) from Northern Australia, Australian Journal of Marine and Freshwater Research 10(2) 177 - 268

External links

tasmanica
Gastropods described in 1877